The 2016–17 North Carolina Tar Heels women's basketball team will represent the University of North Carolina at Chapel Hill during the 2016–17 NCAA Division I women's basketball season. The Tar Heels, led by thirty-first year head coach Sylvia Hatchell, play their games at Carmichael Arena and were members of the Atlantic Coast Conference. They finished the season 15–16, 3–13 in ACC play to finish in a tie for thirteenth place. They advance to the second round of ACC women's tournament where they lost to Syracuse.

Roster

Schedule

|-
!colspan=9 style="background:#56A0D3; color:#FFFFFF;"|Exhibition

|-
!colspan=9 style="background:#56A0D3; color:#FFFFFF;"| Non-conference regular season

|-
!colspan=9 style="background:#56A0D3; color:#FFFFFF;"| ACC regular season

|-
!colspan=9 style="background:#56A0D3;"| ACC Women's Tournament

Source

Rankings

See also
2016–17 North Carolina Tar Heels men's basketball team

References

North Carolina Tar Heels women's basketball seasons
North Carolina
North Car
North Car